Euphorbia antisyphilitica is a species of flowering plant in the spurge family Euphorbiaceae. It is native to the Trans-Pecos of Texas and southern New Mexico in the United States as well as Chihuahua, Coahuila, Hidalgo, and Querétaro in Mexico. Common names include candelilla and wax plant, but the latter is more often applied to members of the unrelated genus Hoya. It is shrubby and has densely clustered, erect, essentially leafless stems that are covered in wax to prevent transpiration.

Uses
The white sap of E. antisyphilitica was historically used in Mexico to treat sexually-transmitted diseases. Commercial harvesting of candelilla wax began at the start of the twentieth century, with demand greatly increasing during World War I and II. This industry largely disappeared following the end of World War II due to diminished candelilla populations and the availability of cheaper petroleum-based waxes.
Later on however, new uses were found for the wax mainly in the cosmetic and food Industries, and it is still being produced in northern Mexico and exported to other countries. E. antisyphilitica is covered under Appendix II of CITES given the significant international trade in its wax derivative.

Cultivation
Candelilla is gaining in popularity as a landscape plant in parts of the arid southwest.  It is popular for the following reasons:
 Once established, it needs little water other than rainfall in cities such as Phoenix or Tucson, making it good as a median planting.
 It can survive in areas that have reflected light.
 It grows best in well-drained soils but can tolerate some clay or limestone.  
 It is visited by butterflies, although not commonly considered a "butterfly plant."
 It is cold-tolerant to 15 degrees F.
 It appears not to be bothered by pests.
 It can be grown in containers.

References

External links

antisyphilitica
Plants described in 1832
Flora of the Chihuahuan Desert
Flora of Chihuahua (state)
Flora of Coahuila
Flora of Hidalgo (state)
Flora of New Mexico
Flora of Querétaro
Flora of Texas
antisyphilitica